Archiboreoiulus is a genus of millipedes belonging to the family Blaniulidae.

The species of this genus are found in Europe.

Species:
 Archiboreoiulus pallidus (Brade-Birks, 1920) 
 Archiboreoiulus sollaudi Brölemann, 1921

References

Julida
Millipede genera